The men's 200 metres at the 2013 World Championships in Athletics was held at the Luzhniki Stadium on 16 and 17 August.

In the final, Adam Gemili seemed to get the best start, but flanked by the Jamaican uniforms, he was quickly swallowed up.  Mid way into the turn, Usain Bolt had a clear lead.  Coming off the turn, Bolt had several meters on the field.  The winner determined, Bolt eased off and cruised across the finish in what would be a great time for any other human being, just a slow 200 for Bolt in 19.66. Coming off the turn about even with Gemili and Nickel Ashmeade, Warren Weir out in lane 8 separated from those two and gained significantly on the slowing Bolt, setting a personal best of 19.79.
Taking a lesson from American teammate Wallace Spearmon who was vanquished in the semis, Curtis Mitchell spotted the field several meters then closed from dead last at the end of the turn to take the bronze.  Gemili took a full dive at the finish to try to beat Ashmeade but still finished in fifth.

Records
Prior to the competition, the records were as follows:

Qualification standards

Schedule

Results

Heats
Qualification: First 3 in each heat (Q) and the next 3 fastest (q) advanced to the semifinals.

Wind: Heat 1: −0.4 m/s, Heat 2: −0.2 m/s, Heat 3: 0.0 m/s, Heat 4: −0.7 m/s, Heat 5: −0.6 m/s, Heat 6: +0.2 m/s, Heat 7: +0.2 m/s.

Semifinals
Qualification: First 2 in each heat (Q) and the next 2 fastest (q) advanced to the final.

Wind: Heat 1: 0.0 m/s, Heat 2: 0.0 m/s, Heat 3: −0.3 m/s.

Final
The final was started at 20:10.

 By winning this 200m final, Usain Bolt became the first man ever to retain the 200m world title three times in a row (winning the title in 2009, in 19.19, and 2011, in 19.40). Calvin Smith and Michael Johnson both won the title twice (in 1983 and 1987, and in 1991 and 1995, respectively) yet only Bolt has retained the title three times (2009, 2011 and 2013).

References

External links
200 metres results at IAAF website

200
200 metres at the World Athletics Championships